The Lamplighter Stakes is an American Thoroughbred horse race run annually during the last week of May at Monmouth Park Racetrack in Oceanport, New Jersey. Open to three-year-old horses, it is contested on turf over a distance of  miles (8.5 furlongs).

Inaugurated in 1946 as the Lamplighter Handicap, the race was named to honor Lamplighter, the 1893 American Co-Champion Older Male Horse owned by proment horseman Pierre Lorillard IV who had been an co-owner of the Monmouth Park Association's racetrack.

Since inception, the race has been contested at various distances on both dirt and turf:
  miles on dirt : 1946–1970, 1972, 1974, 1984,1987
  miles on turf : 1971
  miles on turf : 1973, 1975–1983, 1985–1986, 1988–2004, 2007–present
 1 mile on turf : 2005, 2006

On July 1, 1978 the legendary U.S. Racing Hall of Fame inductee, John Henry, made his turf stakes debut with a third-place finish in the second division of the Lamplighter.

Records
Speed  record:
 1:40.52 – Lendell Ray (2000)

Most wins by an owner:
 2 – George D. Widener Jr. (1950, 1965)
 2 – James Cox Brady Jr. (1953, 1954)
 2 – Calumet Farm (1961, 1971)

Most wins by a jockey:
 5 – Craig Perret (1975, 1976, 1986, 1987, 1988)

Most wins by a trainer:
 4 – William I. Mott (1993, 1995, 2000, 2003)

Winners

References
 The 2008 Lamplighter Stakers at Oceanport Racing Report

Ungraded stakes races in the United States
Horse races in New Jersey
Turf races in the United States
Flat horse races for three-year-olds
Monmouth Park Racetrack
Recurring sporting events established in 1946
1946 establishments in New Jersey